Dickdellia labioflecta is a species of sea snail, a marine gastropod mollusk in the family Zerotulidae, the winkles or periwinkles.

Description
The length of the shell varies between 5 mm and 7.5 mm.

Distribution
This marine species occurs off the South Shetlands and in the Weddell Sea, Antarctica

References

 Warén A. & Hain S. (1996) Description of Zerotulidae fam. nov. (Littorinoidea), with comments on an Antarctic littorinid gastropod. The Veliger 39(4): 277–334.
  Engl, W. (2012). Shells of Antarctica. Hackenheim: Conchbooks. 402 pp.

External links
 Griffiths, H.J.; Linse, K.; Crame, J.A. (2003). SOMBASE - Southern Ocean mollusc database: a tool for biogeographic analysis in diversity and evolution. Organisms Diversity and Evolution. 3: 207-213

Zerotulidae
Gastropods described in 1990